Stonewielder is the third fantasy novel by Canadian author Ian Cameron Esslemont set in the world of the Malazan Book of the Fallen, co-created with Esslemont's friend and colleague Steven Erikson.  Stonewielder is the third of six novels by Esslemont to take place in the Malazan world.

References

2010 Canadian novels
High fantasy novels
Novels of the Malazan Empire
Canadian fantasy novels